"Drinkin' Too Much" is a song recorded by American country singer Sam Hunt. He co-wrote the track with Shane McAnally, Stuart Hine, and producer Zach Crowell. It was included on his 2020 studio album Southside.

Background and release
Hunt wrote the song as an apology to his former on-and-off girlfriend, and later wife, Hannah Lee Fowler. He said he struggled with deciding on whether to release the song or not due to its extremely personal nature, and that releasing "Drinkin' Too Much" made it "a lot easier to put out songs that are more honest". Fowler played the piano at the end of the song, with Hunt adding that he wanted to "have her blessing," and finish it with a "hopeful note".

The song was initially released by surprise on SoundCloud on New Year's Eve, with a later proper release occurring on January 27, 2017.

Critical reception
Laura McClellan of Taste of Country stated that the "8pm" acoustic version of the track showed "another level of vulnerability and authenticity to the already-revealing ballad.

Commercial performance
"Drinkin' Too Much" peaked at number 65  on the Billboard Canadian Hot 100. It also reached peaks of number 89 on the Hot 100 in the United States, and number 16 on the Hot Country Songs chart.

Track listings
Digital download – single
 "Drinkin' Too Much" – 3:51
 "Drinkin' Too Much – 8pm" – 4:38

7-inch vinyl – single
 "Drinkin' Too Much" – 3:51
 "Drinkin' Too Much – 8pm" – 4:38

Charts

References

2017 songs
Sam Hunt songs
Songs about alcohol
Songs written by Sam Hunt
Songs written by Shane McAnally
Songs written by Zach Crowell